In computing, RELAX NG (REgular LAnguage for XML Next Generation) is a schema language for XML—a RELAX NG schema specifies a pattern for the structure and content of an XML document. A RELAX NG schema is itself an XML document but RELAX NG also offers a popular compact, non-XML syntax. Compared to other XML schema languages  RELAX NG is considered relatively simple.

It was defined by a committee specification of the OASIS RELAX NG technical committee in 2001 and 2002, based on Murata Makoto's RELAX and James Clark's TREX, and also by part two of the international standard ISO/IEC 19757: Document Schema Definition Languages (DSDL). ISO/IEC 19757-2 was developed by ISO/IEC JTC 1/SC 34 and published in its first version in 2003.

Schema examples
Suppose we want to define an extremely simple XML markup scheme for a book: a book is defined as a sequence of one or more pages; each page contains text only. A sample XML document instance might be:

<book>
  <page>This is page one.</page>
  <page>This is page two.</page>
</book>

XML syntax
A RELAX NG schema can be written in a nested structure by defining a root element that contains further element definitions, which may themselves contain embedded definitions. A schema for our book in this style, using the full XML syntax, would be written:

<element name="book" xmlns="http://relaxng.org/ns/structure/1.0">
   <oneOrMore>
      <element name="page">
         <text/>
      </element>
   </oneOrMore>
</element>

Nested structure becomes unwieldy with many sublevels and cannot define recursive elements, so most complex RELAX NG schemas use references to named pattern definitions located separately in the schema. Here, a "flattened schema" defines precisely the same book markup as the previous example:

<grammar xmlns="http://relaxng.org/ns/structure/1.0">
   <start>
      <element name="book">
         <oneOrMore>
            <ref name="page"/>
         </oneOrMore>
      </element>
   </start>
   <define name="page">
      <element name="page">
         <text/>
      </element>
   </define>
</grammar>

Compact syntax
RELAX NG compact syntax is a non-XML format inspired by extended Backus-Naur form and regular expressions, designed so that it can be unambiguously translated to its XML counterpart, and back again, with one-to-one correspondence in structure and meaning, in much the same way that Simple Outline XML (SOX) relates to XML. It shares many features with the syntax of DTDs. Here is the compact form of the above schema:

element book {
    element page { text }+
}

With named patterns, this can be flattened to:

start = element book { page+ }
page = element page { text }

A compact RELAX NG parser will treat these two as the same pattern.

Comparison with W3C XML Schema

Although the RELAX NG specification was developed at roughly the same time as the W3C XML Schema specification, the latter was arguably better known and more widely implemented in both open-source and proprietary XML parsers and editors when it became a W3C Recommendation in 2001. Since then, however, RELAX NG support has increasingly found its way into XML software, and its acceptance has been aided by its adoption as a primary schema for popular document-centric markup languages such as DocBook, the TEI Guidelines, OpenDocument, and EPUB.

RELAX NG shares with W3C XML Schema many features that set both apart from traditional DTDs: data typing, regular expression support, namespace support, ability to reference complex definitions.

Filename extensions

By informal convention, RELAX NG schemas in the regular syntax are typically named with the filename extension ".rng". For schemas in the compact syntax, the extension ".rnc" is used.

Determinism
Relax NG schemas are not necessarily "deterministic" or "unambiguous".

Converting Relax NG to DTD
Relax NG schemas can be converted to DTDs by applying Trang which can be found at: . Note that Trang is unable to convert the OASIS DITA 1.3 schema to DTDs, failing with messages like:

  sorry, combining definitions with combine="choice" is not supported

See also
XML schemas
DTD (Document Type Definition)
Document Structure Description
XML Schema (W3C)
Schematron
ODD (One Document Does it all)
SXML

References

External links 
RELAX NG home page
"The Design of RELAX NG" by James Clark
RELAX NG tutorial for the XML syntax
RELAX NG tutorial for the compact syntax
Design patterns for structuring XML documents
RELAX NG Book by Eric van der Vlist, released under the GNU Free Documentation License
Relax NG Reference by ZVON
RELAX NG Java community projects at java.net
Sun Multi-Schema Validator (MSV) open-source Java XML toolkit
Relax NG Compact Syntax validator open-source C program
XSD to Relax NG Converter Web-based converter
https://github.com/relaxng/jing-trang

Computer-related introductions in 2001
Data modeling languages
ISO/IEC standards
XML
XML-based standards